The Lockheed Martin SR-72, colloquially referred to as "Son of Blackbird", is an American hypersonic UAV concept intended for intelligence, surveillance and reconnaissance (ISR) proposed privately in 2013 by Lockheed Martin as a successor to the retired Lockheed SR-71 Blackbird. The company expected an SR-72 test vehicle could fly by 2025.

Design and development

Background and early work
The SR-71 Blackbird was retired by the USAF in 1998, leaving a potential coverage gap between surveillance satellites, crewed aircraft, and unmanned aerial vehicles for intelligence, surveillance and reconnaissance (ISR) and strike missions. With the growth of anti-satellite weapons, anti-access/area denial tactics, and counter-stealth technologies, it was thought that a high-speed aircraft could penetrate protected airspace and observe or strike a target before enemies could detect or intercept it. The proposed reliance on extremely high speed to penetrate defended airspace is considered a significant conceptual departure from the emphasis on stealth in fifth-generation jet fighter programs and projected drone developments.

Lockheed Martin Skunk Works' development work on the SR-72 was first published by Aviation Week & Space Technology on 1 November 2013. Public attention to the news was large enough to overwhelm the Aviation Week servers.

To attain its design speeds, Lockheed Martin has been collaborating with Aerojet Rocketdyne since 2006 on an appropriate engine. The company is developing the system from the scramjet-powered HTV-3X, which was canceled in 2008. The SR-72 is envisioned with an air-breathing hypersonic propulsion system that has the ability to accelerate from standstill to Mach 6 using the same engine, making it about twice as fast as the SR-71. The challenge is to design an engine to encompass the flight regimes of subsonic, supersonic and hypersonic speeds. Using turbine compression, turbojet engines can work at zero speed and usually perform best up to Mach 2.2. Ramjets, using aerodynamic compression with subsonic combustion, perform poorly under Mach 0.5 and are most efficient around Mach 3, being able to go up to around Mach 6. The SR-71's specially designed engines converted to low-speed ramjets by redirecting the airflow around the core and into the afterburner for speeds greater than Mach 2.5. Finally, scramjets with supersonic combustion cover the range of high supersonic to hypersonic speeds. The SR-72 is to use a turbine-based combined cycle (TBCC) system to use a turbine engine at low speeds and a scramjet engine at high speeds. The turbine and ramjet engines share common inlet and nozzle, but with separate airflow paths.

At speeds of Mach 5 and above, aerodynamic heating creates temperatures hot enough to melt conventional metallic airframes, so engineers are considering composites such as high-performance carbon, ceramic, and metal mixes, for fabrication of critical components. Such composites have been used in intercontinental ballistic missiles and the retired Space Shuttle.

New sensors and weapons would likely have to be created specifically to operate at such speeds.

In November 2013, construction of an optionally piloted scaled demonstrator was planned to start in 2018. SR-72 flight testing was planned to follow the timeline for the hypersonic High Speed Strike Weapon. 

The SR-72 follows the US Air Force's hypersonic road map for developing a hypersonic strike weapon by 2020, and a penetrating ISR aircraft by 2030. At the time of the concept's unveiling, Lockheed Martin had engaged in talks with government officials, but has not secured funding for the demonstrator or engine.

On 13 November 2013, Air Force Chief of Staff General Mark Welsh revealed that the service was interested in the SR-72's hypersonic capabilities, but had not spoken with Lockheed Martin about the aircraft.  Its high speed appeals to the service to reduce the time an adversary would have to react to an operation.  They are pursuing hypersonic technology, but do not yet have the material ability to construct a full-size plane like the uncrewed SR-72.  The SR-72 was unveiled in the midst of sequestration budget cuts that have required the Air Force to balance capability, capacity, and mission readiness.  By the mid-2020s, it is believed that foreign countries will produce and export advanced aerial technologies that could end up in battle spaces against the U.S.  This drives the Air Force to further develop new systems, including hypersonic, to replace outclassed legacy systems.

In 2013, it was reported that the SR-72 may face significant challenges to being accepted by the Air Force, as they are opting to develop the Northrop Grumman RQ-180 stealth UAV to perform the task of conducting ISR missions in contested airspace.  Compared to the SR-72, the RQ-180 is less complex to design and manufacture, is less prone to problems with the acquisition, and could enter service as soon as 2015.

2014 NASA contracts
In December 2014, NASA awarded Lockheed Martin a contract to study the feasibility of building the SR-72's propulsion system using existing turbine engine technologies, The $892,292 contract funds a design study to determine the viability of a TBCC propulsion system by combining one of several current turbine engines, with a very low Mach ignition Dual Mode Ramjet (DMRJ).  NASA previously funded a Lockheed Martin study that found speeds up to Mach 7 could be achieved with a dual-mode engine combining turbine and ramjet technologies.  The problem with hypersonic propulsion has always been the gap between the highest speed capabilities of a turbojet, from around Mach 2.2 to the lowest speed of a scramjet at Mach 4. Typical turbine engines cannot achieve high enough speeds for a scramjet to take over and continue accelerating.  The NASA-Lockheed Martin study is looking at the possibility of a higher-speed turbine engine or a scramjet that can function in a turbine engine's slower flight envelope; the DARPA HTV-3X had demonstrated a low-speed ramjet (Dual Mode Ramjet) that could operate below Mach 3.  Existing turbofan engines powering jet fighters and other experimental designs are being considered for modification.  If the study is successful, NASA will fund a demonstrator to test the DMRJ in a flight research vehicle. Aerojet Rocketdyne was awarded a $1,099,916 contract by NASA's Glenn Research Center on 15 December 2014 during mode transition. The two firms were reported to be collaborating on turbine-based combined cycle (TBCC) propulsion system prior to the development of the SR-72 hypersonic demonstrator expected to commence in 2018, with the first flight expected in 2023.

In March 2016, Lockheed Martin CEO Hewson stated that the company was on the verge of a technological breakthrough that would allow its conceptual SR-72 hypersonic plane to reach Mach 6. A hypersonic demonstrator aircraft the size of an F-22 stealth fighter could be built for less than $1 billion.

2017 to present
In June 2017, Lockheed Martin announced that the SR-72 would be in development by the early 2020s, with top speed in excess of Mach 6. Executive Vice President Rob Weiss commented that "We've been saying hypersonics [are] two years away for the last 20 years, but all I can say is the technology is mature and we, along with DARPA and the services, are working hard to get that capability into the hands of our warfighters as soon as possible."

In January 2018, Lockheed Vice President Jack O'Banion gave a presentation that credited the advancements in additive manufacturing and computer modeling, stating that it would not have been possible to make the airplane five years ago and that 3D printing allowed a cooling system to be embedded in the engine.

In February 2018, Orlando Carvalho, Executive Vice President of aeronautics at Lockheed Martin, pushed back on reports of the SR-72's development stating that no SR-72 had been produced. He also clarified that hypersonic research is fueling weapons systems development, and that "Eventually as that technology is matured, it could ultimately enable the development of a reusable vehicle. Prior to this we may have referred to it as a "like an SR-72", but now the terminology of choice is "reusable vehicle".

In November 2018, Lockheed Martin stated that a prototype of the SR-72 was scheduled to fly by 2025. The aircraft is to be capable of firing hypersonic missiles.  The SR-72 could enter service in the 2030s.

See also
DARPA Falcon Project
Boeing X-51
Prompt Global Strike
Aurora (aircraft)
Northrop Grumman RQ-180
Reaction Engines Scimitar
Top Gun: Maverick — 2022 film in which the fictional "Darkstar" aircraft was based on the SR-72 and partially designed by Lockheed Martin engineers
Tupolev Tu-360

References

SR-072
Hypersonic aircraft
Proposed military aircraft of the United States
Scramjet-powered aircraft
Low-wing aircraft
Strategic reconnaissance aircraft